This is a list of earthquakes in 2021. Only earthquakes of magnitude 6 or above are included, unless they result in damage and/or casualties, or are notable for some other reason.  All dates are listed according to UTC time. Maximum intensities are indicated on the Mercalli intensity scale. The year 2021 was a very active period for global seismicity, with 19 major earthquakes, three of which were over 8.0, and was also the most seismically active since 2007. There were a total of 2,476 fatalities, with the majority from a M 7.2 in Haiti. Fatalities occurred in every month of the year. Earthquake activity was lowest in June, while August was the most active and deadliest month. Major events also took place in Indonesia, Japan, China, Pakistan, Mexico and Peru. A M 7.3 quake in China was the most intense event of the year (MMI X, Extreme). A rare 5.9 magnitude earthquake struck Victoria, Australia in September.

Compared to other years

By death toll 

Listed are earthquakes with at least 10 dead.

By magnitude 
Listed are earthquakes with at least 7.0 magnitude.

By month

January

February

March

April

May

June

July

August

September

October

November

December

See also 
 
 List of earthquakes 2021–2030
 Lists of 21st-century earthquakes
 Lists of earthquakes by year
 Lists of earthquakes

References 

earthquakes
earthquakes
2021
 
2021